Padinharathara is a village and important junction in Wayanad district in the state of Kerala, India. The biggest earth dam in Asia is situated in this Village.

Demographics
As of the 2001 India census, Padinharethara had a population of 15,174 with 7,517 males and 7,657 females.

Suburbs and villages
 Kuppadithara
 Kavumannam

Transportation

Padinjarethara can be accessed from Mananthavady or Kalpetta. The Periya ghat road connects Mananthavady to Kannur and Thalassery. The Thamarassery mountain road connects Calicut with Kalpetta. The Kuttiady mountain road connects Vatakara with Kalpetta and Mananthavady. The Palchuram mountain road connects Kannur and Iritty with Mananthavady. The road from Nilambur to Ooty is also connected to Wayanad district through the village of Meppadi.

The nearest railway station is at Kozhikode and the nearest airports are Kannur International Airport at 58 km away, Kozhikode International Airport at 120 km away, and Bengaluru International Airport at 290 km away.

Important landmarks
  Temple
  Temple
 
 
 
 
 
 
 Louis Mount Psychiatric Hospital
  Church
  Dam – the largest dam in India

Image gallery

References

Villages in Wayanad district
Padinharethara area
Cities and towns in Wayanad district